The 1924–25 Hamilton Tigers season was the fifth and last season of the Tigers. The club won the regular season but did not play in the playoffs as the players went on strike for increased pay. NHL president Frank Calder suspended the team. In the off-season, the assets of the Tigers were sold to form the new New York Americans expansion team.

Offseason
The league added two new expansion teams: the Boston Bruins and the Montreal Maroons. The Bruins became the first American-based team in the NHL.

Jimmy Gardner was named coach of the team.

Regular season

Final standings

Record vs. opponents

Playoffs
The Tigers players went on strike to gain an increase in pay for the longer season. After the first playoff series was completed, NHL President Calder suspended the team, awarding the championship to the first round winner. Calder imposed a fine on the players and this was paid after the franchise was sold to New York.

Schedule and results

Player statistics

Note: Pos = Position; GP = Games played; G = Goals; A = Assists; Pts = Points; PIM = Penalty minutes      MIN = Minutes played; W = Wins; L = Losses; T = Ties; GA = Goals-against; GAA = Goals-against average; SO = Shutouts;

Awards and records
 Hart Trophy – Billy Burch

Transactions

See also
1924–25 NHL season

References

Bibliography

 
 

Hamilton Tigers (ice hockey) seasons
Hamilton
Hamilton